Izabella Scorupco (born Izabela Dorota Skorupko; 4 June 1970) is a Polish actress, singer and model. She is best known for having played Bond girl Natalya Simonova in the 1995 James Bond film GoldenEye. She is also known for her cover of the Shirley & Company song "Shame, Shame, Shame" which was released in 1992 and became a European hit.

Life
Scorupco was born to Lech, a musician, and Magdalena Skorupko, a doctor, in Białystok, Poland, in 1970. When she was one year old, her parents separated, and she remained with her mother. In 1978, they moved to Bredäng in Stockholm, Sweden, where Scorupco learned to speak Swedish, English and French.

On 25 December 1996, Scorupco married Polish ice hockey player Mariusz Czerkawski. They had one daughter together, Julia (born 16 September 1997). They divorced in 1998.

On 30 January 2003, Scorupco married an American, Jeffrey Raymond; they have a son, Jakob (born 24 July 2003). They divorced in 2015. She now lives in Los Angeles and New York City. Since 2017, Scorupco has been in a relationship with Karl Rosengren. They married on 6 October 2019. In 2014, Scorupco became an American citizen.

Career
In the late 1980s, Scorupco travelled throughout Europe working as a model, and appeared on the cover of Vogue. In 1987, she was discovered by director Staffan Hildebrand and starred in the film Ingen kan älska som vi ("Nobody can love like us"). In the early 1990s, she had a brief but successful career as a pop singer, releasing the album IZA, which was certified gold in Sweden in 1991. Her 1992 cover version of "Shame, Shame, Shame" was a hit in several European countries.

In 2011, Scorupco reprised her singing career, duetting with Swedish musician Peter Jöback in his single Jag Har Dig Nu and featuring in the song's music video. She also starred in Jöback's short extension film La vie, L'amour, La mort. Scorupco went on to host the spring 2012 series of Sweden's Next Top Model but did not continue it for a second series.

Scorupco moved into comedy in July 2013 when she was named to a lead role in a Swedish romantic comedy film, Micke & Veronica, alongside David Hellenius. It premiered on 25 December 2014.

Filmography

Discography

Studio albums

Singles

References

External links

1970 births
20th-century Polish actresses
21st-century Polish actresses
20th-century Swedish actresses
21st-century Swedish actresses
20th-century American actresses
21st-century American actresses
Living people
Actors from Białystok
Polish emigrants to Sweden
Polish expatriates in the United States
Polish female models
Polish film actresses
American female models
American film actresses
Swedish expatriates in the United States
Swedish female models
Swedish film actresses
People with acquired Swedish citizenship
People with acquired American citizenship
Artists from Białystok
American people of Polish descent
American people of Swedish descent